"Lo Vas a Olvidar" is a song recorded by American singer Billie Eilish and Spanish singer Rosalía. The track was written by both performers alongside El Guincho & Eilish's brother and producer Finneas. It was released on January 21, 2021, along with its music video, through Darkroom and Interscope. It is a part of the soundtrack to the Jules special episode of the American teen drama series Euphoria. It is also the lead single from the first season soundtrack, released on May 14, 2021 by Interscope.

Background 
On February 26, 2019, Eilish told BBC Radio 1 that she and Rosalía had a recording session where they made a song together. Eilish also talked about what it was like to work with Rosalía. "It was great, she actually knows what she wants," Eilish said. "That’s why it was kind of refreshing 'cause I was like, 'Wow, you're the only other person I've really met that's like this".

Eilish performed a concert at the Sant Jordi Club in Barcelona on March 9, and the following day Rosalía posted a picture of both on social media and stated "can't wait to finish our song. Sharing with you in the studio or seeing you live yesterday inspires me very much". Later that month Eilish revealed that the song was half in Spanish and half in English and described it as "beautiful", and said that they were "both in love with it".

Due to Rosalía embarking on her El Mal Querer Tour from March to December 2019 and Eilish preparing for her When We All Fall Asleep Tour (which ran from April to November) the song remained unfinished due to scheduling conflicts. In April 2020 Rosalía told Zane Lowe that while in lockdown due to the COVID-19 pandemic she had been working on the track for over two consecutive weeks. By that time the arrangements, the production design, and Rosalía's vocals were completed. Only Eilish's vocals needed to be sent. The song was reportedly completed in June.

In January 2021 Finneas expressed admiration for a Billboard article about the bilingual collaborations the magazine anticipated in 2021. The official announcement of the song was made on January 19 on social media, alongside the trailer for the second special episode of Euphoria.

Recording and composition 
During an interview with Zane Lowe, Eilish stated that the making of this song "is the longest lead-up in the world". The first joint recording session for the song was in Los Angeles in January 2019, where most of the song was written and recorded. During the recording session "Rosalía had opened a channel in Eilish that she hadn't tried before" reaching a new range of high notes. Also during the session, they discussed whether the song should be in the Spanish or in the English language, in which Eilish insisted to sing in Spanish. Eilish later felt like her singing voice in Spanish "makes you sound better". As Eilish isn't fluent in that language, Rosalía had to coach the American singer and translate the lyrics to her. After that, a second collaborative session in the United States was held in July. Producer Finneas O'Connell told the press that the song went through a lot of stages, something quite rare since he and his sister usually keep the first impression as the final sound. Rosalía's part and the arrangements for the song were reportedly finished by April 2020. Although the track was scheduled to be released during summertime in 2020, the production was revamped during that time and the final verses were added by Eilish with a little help from other O'Connell family members.

"Lo Vas a Olvidar" is a hymn-based ballad incorporating "inventive art pop". Steffanee Wong of Nylon stated that the song is sang entirely a capella, and mentioned it had "sparse nature sounds and atmospheric synths forming a misty backdrop, as Eilish and Rosalía do vocal gymnastics around each other, sometimes in English but mostly in Spanish." Patrick Hosken of MTV said it features a "dreamlike plane where slight shifts in mood and atmosphere are guided by powerful vocal moments from each."

Critical reception
"Lo Vas a Olvidar" received generally positive reviews from critics. Chris Deville of Stereogum described the track as "ominous" and "minimal". Marcus Jones of Entertainment Weekly viewed the song as "haunting". Seventeen Carolyn Twersky praised the song as "beautiful". Writing for Pitchfork, Eric Torres commented that "Eilish and Rosalía’s rich harmonies create a supernal vibe entirely their own, amounting to a decent if inessential addition to their catalogs".

Accolades

Music video
A music video "Lo Vas a Olvidar" was released the same day as the song. The video was directed by Nabil Elderkin. The music features Eilish and Rosalía alone in a dark room, lit only by a moving spotlight, singing into a shadowy and stormy void.

Reception
Shakiel Mahjouri of Entertainment Tonight Canada described the visual as "intoxicating" and "trance-like". The staff of People magazine viewed the video as "dreamlike". Jem Aswad of Variety called the video "moody" and "atmospheric". Jordan Darville of The Fader said that the video was "very intense, yet glamorous." Writing for Complex, Joe Price described the visual as "striking," and noted that it "pairs well with the song."

Charts

Weekly charts

Year-end charts

Release history

References

2020s ballads
2021 songs
2021 singles
Billie Eilish songs
Rosalía songs
Music videos directed by Nabil Elderkin
Pop ballads
Song recordings produced by Finneas O'Connell
Songs from television series
Songs written by Finneas O'Connell
Songs written by Billie Eilish
Songs written by Rosalía
Songs written by el Guincho
Spanish-language songs
Female vocal duets
Interscope Records singles
Art pop songs